Xixian may refer to:

 Xi County, Henan (息县), of Xinyang, Henan
 Xi County, Shanxi (隰县), of Linfen, Shanxi
 Deng Xiaoping or Xixian (希贤; 1904–1997), Chinese paramount leader